Ghost Asylum was an American paranormal television series that aired from September 7, 2014, to June 5, 2016, in the United States on Destination America. The series features a group of professional ghost hunters that try to "trap ghosts" in the country's most haunted abandoned asylums, sanitariums, and mental hospitals. The show was renewed for a second season of 15 episodes, which premiered on April 5, 2015, and aired in two halves with the second half airing in late-2014.

The series follows the paranormal team known as the "Tennessee Wraith Chasers"; the pilot of the series was originally named "Ghostland Tennessee" before it was renamed for the Destination America network.

Premise
The series features a group of fearless ghost hunters with their paranormal team called the Tennessee Wraith Chasers, who use various methods to try and create supernatural inventions during their investigations in America's most haunted locations, which just happen to be abandoned asylums. Their specialty is investigating the many decaying and derelict mental institutions littered across The United States.

Series overview

Episodes

Season 1 (2014)

Season 2 (2015)

Season 3 (2016)

See also
Haunted Towns
Apparitional experience
Parapsychology
Ghost hunting

References

External links

Tennessee Wraith Chasers official website

Paranormal reality television series
2010s American documentary television series
2010s American reality television series
2014 American television series debuts
2016 American television series endings
English-language television shows
Destination America original programming